George Kellogg (June 19, 1812 – 1901) was an American inventor and patent expert. 
 
Kellogg was born at New Hartford, Connecticut in 1812 to Isaac Kellogg (1782-1824) and Aurilla Barney (1792-1861). George graduated from Wesleyan University in 1837.  From 1838 to 1841, he was principal of the Sumter Academy in Sumterville, South Carolina.  He was for some time a manufacturer in Birmingham, Connecticut, and was in the United States revenue service from 1863 to 1866.  He established factories in England, was a patent expert, and patented a machine for making jack chains (1844), a dovetailing machine (1849), a type-distributing machine (1852), and improved surgical instruments (1853).  He married Jane Elizabeth Crosby (1816-1892) and they had a child, Clara Louise Kellogg.

References
 

1812 births
1901 deaths
19th-century American inventors
People from New Hartford, Connecticut
Wesleyan University alumni